Boxalls Bay is a small bay located on the western side of the Forestier Peninsula, facing Norfolk Bay. It lies south of Tinpot Island and North of Eaglehawk Neck.

References

Bays of Tasmania
East Coast Tasmania
Peninsulas of Tasmania
South East coast of Tasmania